Bath Racecourse is a thoroughbred horse racing venue on Lansdown Hill, about  northeast of Bath, Somerset, England. It is owned and operated by Arena Racing Company.

The racecourse is a left-handed oval track of 1 mile 4 furlongs and 25 yards, with a run-in of nearly half-a-mile. The home straight is 4 furlongs, with a steady rise and turn. It is the highest flat racecourse in the country and has no watering facility, so the going can become very firm during a dry summer.

History
Racing was first recorded at Bath in 1728. In 1811, the first major meet at Bath Racecourse was held, under the auspices of a local family, the Blathwayts. Originally there was just one meet a year at the course, lasting for two days, but gradually over the years, the number of meets increased to its present level of twenty-two. In the early years, the Somerset Stakes was the major race of the calendar, and this race is still held annually. In 1844 this race was a sweepstake of 25 sovereigns each with £100 added by the committee. It was won by the Duke of Richmond's Red Deer, a three-year-ol carrying 4st 11ibs, who went on to win the Chester Cup. The owner of the second got his £25 back, but the winner had to pay £10 for preparing the course and £5 for weights and scales.

There were a number of grandstand buildings in those days and people used to watch the races from their carriages, lined up beside the track.

During World War II, the racecourse was used as a landing field by the Royal Air Force and named RAF North Stoke.

In 1953, Bath Racecourse was the site of a criminal plot surrounding the "Spa selling plate". Having two horses that looked almost identical, the gang substituted a good horse for a poor one. They bet heavily on the substituted horse and damaged the power supply to the racecourse, which prevented the bookmakers from changing the odds which remained at 10-1. The horse won the race and the gang would have profited highly had not racing officials become suspicious and called in Scotland Yard. The gang were subsequently brought to justice.

In 2015/16 the racecourse facilities underwent a significant redevelopment and investment programme, funded by the Arena Racing Company. The racetrack has a new look with bands of buttermilk and French grey, the parade ring is revamped and the Beckford Bar opened. The new Langridge Grandstand opened in July 2016 and has various new facilities including a canopied roof garden from which races can be watched. It is also available as a venue between race days for corporate events, dinners and weddings.

Notable races

 Dick Hern Fillies' Stakes (now run at Haydock Park)

References

Further reading

External links 

Bath Racecourse (Official website)
Course guide on GG.COM
Course guide on At The Races

 
Horse racing venues in England
Sports venues in Bath, Somerset
Sports venues completed in 1728
1728 establishments in England